Passaic (  or  ) is a city in Passaic County, in the U.S. state of New Jersey. As of the 2020 United States census, the city was the state's 16th-most-populous municipality, with a population of 70,537, an increase of 756 (+1.1%) from the 2010 census count of 69,781, which in turn reflected increase of 1,920 residents (+2.8%) from the 2000 census population of 67,861. The Census Bureau's Population Estimates Program calculated that the city's population was 69,633 in 2021, ranking the city the 541st-most-populous in the country. Among cities with more than 50,000 people, Passaic was the fifth-most-densely-populated municipality in the United States, with more than 22,000 people per square mile.

Located north of Newark on the Passaic River, it was first settled in 1678 by Dutch traders, as Acquackanonk Township. The city and river get their name from the Lenape word "pahsayèk" which has been variously attributed to mean "valley" or "place where the land splits."

History

The city originated from a Dutch settlement on the Passaic River established in 1679 which was called Acquackanonk. Industrial growth began in the 19th century, as Passaic became a textile and metalworking center.

A commercial center formed around a wharf at the foot of present-day Main Avenue. This came to be commonly known as Acquackanonk Landing, and the settlement that grew around it became known as the Village of Acquackanonk Landing or simply Acquackanonk Landing Settlement. In 1854 Alfred Speer (later owner of the city's first newspaper and public hall) and Judge Henry Simmons were the principals in a political battle over the naming of village. Simmons wished to keep the old name while Speer wanted to simplify it to Passaic Village. Speer was losing the battle however he convinced the U.S. Postmaster General to adopt the name, and hung a Passaic sign at the local railroad depot. The de facto name change was effective.

Passaic was formed as an unincorporated village within Acquackanonk Township (now Clifton) on March 10, 1869. It was incorporated as an independent village on March 21, 1871. Passaic was chartered as a city on April 2, 1873.The Okonite company owned an industrial site here from 1878 to 1993. It was the company's headquarters and primary manufacturing plant for most of the company's history. Early uses of the company's insulated wires include some of the earliest telegraph cables, and the wiring for Thomas Edison's first generating plant, Pearl Street Station in Lower Manhattan. The property was then turned into a furniture factory, whose owners have been attempting to redevelop the property into an upscale mall since 2015.

The 1926 Passaic Textile Strike led by union organizer Albert Weisbord saw 36,000 mill workers leave their jobs to oppose wage cuts demanded by the textile industry. The workers successfully fought to keep their wages unchanged but did not receive recognition of their union by the mill owners.

Passaic has been called "The Birthplace of Television".  In 1931, experimental television station W2XCD began transmitting from DeForest Radio Corporation in Passaic. It has been called the first television station to transmit to the home, and was the first such station to broadcast a feature film. Allen B. DuMont, formerly DeForest's chief engineer, opened pioneering TV manufacturer DuMont Laboratories in Passaic in 1937, and started the DuMont Television Network, the world's first commercial television network, in 1946.

Passaic is served by two regional newspapers, The Record and Herald News which are both owned by the Gannett company and  its predecessor North Jersey Media Group.

The city previously had many of its own newspaper companies, among them Speer's The Passaic Item (1870–1904), the Passaic City Herald (1872–1899), the Passaic Daily Times (1882–1887), the Passaic City Record (1890–1907), the Passaic Daily News (1891–1929), the Passaic Daily Herald (1899–1929), and the Passaic Herald News (1932–1987). The Passaic Herald News went through several mergers with other Passaic County newspapers to become the current Herald News.

Geography
According to the U.S. Census Bureau, the city had a total area of 3.24 square miles (8.39 km2), including 3.13 square miles (8.11 km2) of land and 0.11 square miles (0.28 km2) of water (3.33%).

Passaic's only land border is with neighboring Clifton, which borders Passaic to the north, south, and west. The Passaic River forms the eastern border of Passaic. Four additional neighboring municipalities in Bergen County immediately across the river from Passaic are East Rutherford, Garfield, Rutherford, and Wallington.

Passaic and Wallington are connected via the Gregory Avenue, Market Street, and Eighth Street bridges. The city connects with Garfield at the Monroe Street Bridge and Passaic Street Bridge. The connection with Rutherford is via the Union Avenue Bridge, which is located on an extension off of the northbound lanes of Route 21. One cannot cross from Passaic into East Rutherford by vehicle directly, however, as there is no bridge connecting the two municipalities. Drivers wanting to cross from Passaic to East Rutherford must use either the Gregory Avenue Bridge which is located near Wallington's border with East Rutherford, or the Union Avenue Bridge, where East Rutherford can be accessed via surface streets.

The city

Passaic has several business districts: Main Avenue begins in Passaic Park and follows the curve of the river to downtown. Broadway runs east–west through the center of the city, ending at Main Avenue in downtown. Main Avenue has many shops, restaurants, and businesses reflecting the city's Latino and Eastern European populations.

The city is home to several architecturally notable churches, including St. John's Lutheran Church, First Presbyterian of Passaic, and St. John's Episcopal Church.

Passaic Park
Many residents of Southwest Passaic, also known as Passaic Park, are part of Orthodox Jewish communities. With over 1,300 families estimated at a total population of 15,000, Passaic is one of the state's fastest-growing Orthodox communities. It is home to over 20 yeshivas and other institutions as well as many kosher food and shopping establishments.

The Passaic Park section is noted for its large park and large homes of various architectural styles, especially Queen Anne and Tudor. Several condominium and cooperative apartment complexes are also located here including:
 Carlton Tower, a condominium of 21 stories, the city's tallest structure
 The Towers, rental across the street from Carlton Towers
 Barry Gardens, co-operative garden apartments next door to The Towers
 Presidential Towers, condominium

Climate
The climate in this area is characterized by hot, humid summers and generally mild to cool winters. According to the Köppen Climate Classification system, Passaic has a humid subtropical climate, abbreviated "Cfa" on climate maps.

Demographics

Among the speakers of Polish in Passaic are many Gorals.

2010 census

The Census Bureau's 2006–2010 American Community Survey showed that (in 2010 inflation-adjusted dollars) median household income was $31,135 (with a margin of error of +/− $1,280) and the median family income was $34,934 (+/− $2,987). Males had a median income of $30,299 (+/− $1,883) versus $25,406 (+/− $2,456) for females. The per capita income for the city was $14,424 (+/− $581). About 25.0% of families and 27.5% of the population were below the poverty line, including 35.9% of those under age 18 and 25.5% of those age 65 or over.

Same-sex couples headed 107 households in 2010, a decline from the 142 counted in 2000.

2000 census
As of the 2000 United States census, there were 67,861 people, 19,458 households, and 14,457 families residing in the city of Passaic, New Jersey. The population density was 21,804.7 people per square mile (8,424.8/km2). There were 20,194 housing units at an average density of 6,488.6 per square mile (2,507.1/km2). The racial makeup of the city was 35.43% White, 13.83% African American, 0.78% Native American, 5.51% Asian, 0.04% Pacific Islander, 39.36% from other races, and 5.04% from two or more races. The cultural groupings for Hispanic or Latino of any race were 62.46% of the population.

As of the 2000 census, 59.3% of residents spoke Spanish at home, while 28.9% of residents identified themselves as speaking only English at home. An additional 2.5% were speakers of Gujarati and 2.4% spoke Polish. There were 31,101 foreign-born residents of Passaic in 2000, of which 79.4% were from Latin America, with 31.3% of foreign-born residents from Mexico and 27.2% from the Dominican Republic.

There were 19,458 households, of which 42.0% had children under the age of 18, 43.7% were married couples living together, 21.7% had a female householder with no husband present, and 25.7% were non-families. 8.2% of Passaic households were same-sex partner households. 20.3% of all households were made up of individuals, and 8.4% had someone living alone who was 65 years of age or older. The average household size was 3.46 and the average family size was 3.93.The city population comprised 30.8% under the age of 18, 12.5% from 18 to 24, 31.6% from 25 to 44, 16.9% from 45 to 64, and 8.1% who were 65 years of age or older. The median age was 29 years. For every 100 females, there were 99.5 males. For every 100 females age 18 and over, there were 97.4 males.
The median income for a household in the city was $33,594, and the median income for a family was $34,935. Males had a median income of $24,568 versus $21,352 for females. The per capita income for the city was $12,874. About 18.4% of families and 21.2% of the population were below the poverty line, including 27.6% of those under age 18 and 16.0% of those age 65 or over.

Economy
Portions of the city are part of an Urban Enterprise Zone (UEZ), one of 32 zones covering 37 municipalities statewide. The city was selected in 1994 as one of a group of 10 zones added to participate in the program. In addition to other benefits to encourage employment within the UEZ, shoppers can take advantage of a reduced 3.3125% sales tax rate (half of the % rate charged statewide) at eligible merchants. Established in August 1994, the city Urban Enterprise Zone status expires in August 2025. Overseen by the Passaic Enterprise Zone Development Corporation, the program generates $1.2 million annually in tax revenues that are reinvested into the local zone.

Government

Local government

Passaic is governed by the Faulkner Act system of municipal government, formally known as the Optional Municipal Charter Law, under the Mayor-Council (Plan B), enacted by direct petition as of July 1, 1973. The city is one of 71 municipalities (of the 564) statewide governed under this form. Under this form of government, the governing body is comprised of a mayor and a city council. The mayor is elected directly by the voters for a four-year term of office. The seven members of the city council serve four-year terms on a staggered basis, with either three seats (together with the mayoral seat) or four seats up for election in odd-numbered years. Elections are non-partisan, with all positions selected at-large in balloting held in May.

, Passaic's mayor is Hector Carlos Lora, whose term of office ends June 30, 2025. Lora was appointed in 2016 to fill a vacancy that followed the resignation of Democratic mayor Dr. Alex Blanco after he was indicted on federal corruption charges; Lora was the Director of the Passaic County Board of Chosen Freeholders at the time and was forced to resign his position. He served the remainder of Blanco's unexpired term and was elected to a full term in 2017. Members of the Passaic City Council are Council President Gary Schaer (term ends 2023), Jose R. "Joe" Garcia (2025), Terrence L. Love (2025), Thania Melo (2023), Chaim M. Munk (2023) and Daniel J. Schwartz (2025), with one seat declared vacant.

The seat expiring in June 2023 that had been held by Salim Patel was declared vacant in June 2022 after it was determined that he had missed more council meetings than allowed by statute.

In addition to his role as council president, Schaer also holds a seat in the New Jersey General Assembly. This dual position, often called double dipping, is allowed under a grandfather clause in the state law enacted by the New Jersey Legislature and signed into law by Governor of New Jersey Jon Corzine in September 2007 that prevents dual-office-holding but allows those who had held both positions as of February 1, 2008, to retain both posts.

Corruption charges over the past decades have resulted in the federal convictions of two mayors, seven councilman and other public officials, all members of the Democratic Party. Passaic Business Administrator Anthony Ianoco was terminated in February 2011 after he was charged with cocaine possession, following his arrest in Hoboken, where police arrested him after he was caught driving the wrong way in a Passaic city vehicle.

Alex Blanco became the first Dominican-American elected as mayor in the United States winning a special election in November 2008 to succeed acting mayor Gary Schaer, who as City Council president automatically moved into the position upon the resignation by previous mayor Samuel Rivera, after Rivera pleaded guilty to corruption charges. Blanco was elected to serve the remainder of Rivera's term, and was re-elected to a full term on May 12, 2009, with 53.1% of votes cast. He won running against Passaic Board of Education member Vinny Capuana.

Federal, state, and county representation
Passaic is located in the 9th Congressional District and is part of New Jersey's 36th state legislative district.

 

Passaic County is governed by Board of County Commissioners, comprised of seven members who are elected at-large to staggered three-year terms office on a partisan basis, with two or three seats coming up for election each year as part of the November general election in a three-year cycle. At a reorganization meeting held in January, the board selects a Director and Deputy Director from among its members to serve for a one-year term. , Passaic County's Commissioners are: Director Bruce James (D, Clifton, term as commissioner ends December 31, 2023; term as director ends 2022), Deputy Director Cassandra "Sandi" Lazzara (D, Little Falls, term as commissioner ends 2024; term as deputy director ends 2022), and  John W. Bartlett (D, Wayne, 2024), Theodore O. "T.J." Best Jr. (D, Paterson, 2023), Terry Duffy (D, West Milford, 2022), Nicolino Gallo (R, Totowa, 2024), and Pasquale "Pat" Lepore (D, Woodland Park, 2022). Constitutional officers, elected on a countywide basis are: County Clerk Danielle Ireland-Imhof (D, Hawthorne, 2023), Sheriff Richard H. Berdnik (D, Clifton, 2022), and Surrogate Zoila S. Cassanova (D, Wayne, 2026).

Politics
As of March 2011, there were a total of 24,227 registered voters in Passaic, of which 8,753 (36.1% vs. 31.0% countywide) were registered as Democrats, 2,063 (8.5% vs. 18.7%) were registered as Republicans and 13,408 (55.3% vs. 50.3%) were registered as Unaffiliated. There were 3 voters registered to other parties. Among the city's 2010 Census population, 34.7% (vs. 53.2% in Passaic County) were registered to vote, including 50.7% of those ages 18 and over (vs. 70.8% countywide).

In the 2012 presidential election, Democrat Barack Obama received 77.1% of the vote (12,011 cast), ahead of Republican Mitt Romney with 22.1% (3,447 votes), and other candidates with 0.8% (119 votes), among the 15,755 ballots cast by the city's 27,433 registered voters (178 ballots were spoiled), for a turnout of 57.4%. In the 2008 presidential election, Democrat Barack Obama received 12,386 votes (72.7% vs. 58.8% countywide), ahead of Republican John McCain with 4,012 votes (23.6% vs. 37.7%) and other candidates with 93 votes (0.5% vs. 0.8%), among the 17,033 ballots cast by the city's 25,496 registered voters, for a turnout of 66.8% (vs. 70.4% in Passaic County). In the 2004 presidential election, Democrat John Kerry received 9,539 votes (66.3% vs. 53.9% countywide), ahead of Republican George W. Bush with 4,291 votes (29.8% vs. 42.7%) and other candidates with 62 votes (0.4% vs. 0.7%), among the 14,391 ballots cast by the city's 23,389 registered voters, for a turnout of 61.5% (vs. 69.3% in the whole county).

In the 2013 gubernatorial election, Democrat Barbara Buono received 59.6% of the vote (4,109 cast), ahead of Republican Chris Christie with 39.1% (2,697 votes), and other candidates with 1.3% (88 votes), among the 7,143 ballots cast by the city's 28,209 registered voters (249 ballots were spoiled), for a turnout of 25.3%. In the 2009 gubernatorial election, Democrat Jon Corzine received 5,958 ballots cast (68.7% vs. 50.8% countywide), ahead of Republican Chris Christie with 2,319 votes (26.7% vs. 43.2%), Independent Chris Daggett with 124 votes (1.4% vs. 3.8%) and other candidates with 52 votes (0.6% vs. 0.9%), among the 8,672 ballots cast by the city's 24,219 registered voters, yielding a 35.8% turnout (vs. 42.7% in the county).

Education

Public

The Passaic City School District is a comprehensive community public school district serving students in pre-kindergarten through twelfth grade. The district is one of 31 former Abbott districts statewide that were established pursuant to the decision by the New Jersey Supreme Court in Abbott v. Burke which are now referred to as "SDA Districts" based on the requirement for the state to cover all costs for school building and renovation projects in these districts under the supervision of the New Jersey Schools Development Authority. As of the 2018–19 school year, the district, comprised of 17 schools, had an enrollment of 14,504 students and 839.8 classroom teachers (on an FTE basis), for a student–teacher ratio of 17.3:1. 

Schools in the district (with 2018–19 enrollment data from the National Center for Education Statistics) are 
Vincent Capuana School No. 15 (277; Pre-K), 
Sallie D. Gamble School No. 16 (465; Pre-K), 
Thomas Jefferson School No. 1 (788; K–8), 
George Washington School No. 2 (172; K–1), 
Mario J. Drago School No. 3 (formerly Franklin School) (803; Pre-K–8), 
Benito Juárez School No. 5 (472; K–8), 
Martin Luther King Jr. School No. 6 (1,124; Pre-K–8), 
Ulysses S. Grant School No. 7 (391; Pre-K–1), 
Casimir Pulaski School No. 8 (%32; Pre-K–8), Etta Gero School No. 9 (690; 2–8), Theodore Roosevelt School No. 10 (905; Pre-K–8), 
William B. Cruise Veterans Memorial School No. 11 (1,253; K–8), 
Daniel F. Ryan School No. 19 (874; Pre-K/2–8), Passaic Gifted and Talented Academy School No. 20 (959; 2–8), 
Sonia Sotomayor School No. 21 (Pre-K–5), 
Passaic Academy for Science and Engineering (702; 6–11), 
Passaic Preparatory Academy, (701; 6–11) and 
Passaic High School (2,618; 9–12). 

Passaic County Community College opened a new campus in the city in September 2008, which will allow PCCC to reach the 15% of its students who come from the city of Passaic. The college's nursing program will be relocated and expanded at the new campus to provide a qualified program to help fill the longstanding nursing shortage.

Private
St. Nicholas Ukrainian Catholic School is an elementary school founded in 1943 that operates under the supervision of the Roman Catholic Diocese of Paterson and the Ukrainian Catholic Archeparchy of Philadelphia.

Established in 1895, the Collegiate School is a private coeducational day school located in Passaic which serves students in pre-kindergarten through twelfth grade.

The Yeshiva Gedola of Passaic is an institute of Talmudic learning for post-high-school-age men. It is led by Rosh Yeshiva Rabbi Meir Stern. Passaic has two primary Orthodox K–8 elementary schools, Yeshiva Ketana and Hillel, each of them has a boys and girls division.

Noble Leadership Academy is an Islamic school located downtown, serving students 320 students from pre-kindergarten to 12th grade.

Emergency services

Police
In October 2016, Deputy Chief Luis Guzman became the first Dominican-American to be selected to lead the city's police department.

Fire
The Passaic Fire Department (PFD) is a paid fire department with over 100 firefighters. The PFD was organized in November 1869 and became a paid department in 1909. There are two fire houses equipped with four engines and two ladder trucks. Passaic also operates a large foam tanker truck, a Quick Attack Response Vehicle (QRV), a haz-mat decon trailer, a utility unit, a rehab unit, and a Zodiac rescue boat.

Ambulance
In October 2015, the city approved a contract under which ambulance service in the city is covered by Monmouth Ocean Hospital Service Corporation (MONOC), a non-profit consortium which also provides paramedic services to other municipalities in the area. Under the plan Passaic laid off 30 EMS workers who had been employed by the city.

Hatzolah of Passaic/Clifton EMS is a volunteer service that primarily covers the Passaic Park section of town and parts of Clifton, in addition to assisting Passaic Police and EMS when requested in other parts of the city. Hatzolah operates two ambulances strategically parked throughout the community with a third on standby and available to assist neighboring chapters.

Office of Emergency Management 
The OEM coordinates emergency response by all of the city's agencies—Police, Fire, Ambulance, health, and public works—to disasters and other emergencies, including large storms. The city OEM is affiliated with the Passaic County and New Jersey State OEM agencies and with the state's Emergency Management Association.

OEM also manages street traffic at all large events in the city, including festivals and parades.

The office is run by representatives of the Police and Fire departments. In addition to city staff, it makes use of volunteers from Passaic's Community Emergency Response Team and other community organizations.

Religion

Judaism
Passaic, with over 20 synagogues and an Orthodox Jewish population of 15,000, has one of the largest Orthodox Jewish communities in New Jersey along with the townships of Lakewood, Teaneck, and Jackson.

Passaic Torah Institute

Transportation

Roads and highways

The main highway directly serving Passaic is Route 21. New Jersey Route 3, the Garden State Parkway and I-80 are nearby. The city has six bridges in use spanning the Passaic River. A seventh bridge serves railroad traffic but is not currently in use.

Public transportation

Local bus transportation, much passing through the Passaic Bus Terminal, is provided by NJ Transit and Community Coach with service to Paterson, Rutherford, Newark, Clifton, Garfield, and Wallington among other locations on the 74, 702, 703, 705, 707, 709, 744, 758, 780 and 970 routes. NJ Transit bus routes 161 and 190 provide local service and interstate service to the Port Authority Bus Terminal in New York City.

NJ Transit's Passaic rail station is located in the Passaic Park section, providing service on the Main Line southbound to Hoboken Terminal, and to Secaucus Junction for NJ Transit connections to New York Penn Station in New York City, Newark Airport and points north and south. Northbound service is provided to Paterson, Ridgewood and New York City stations in Suffern and Port Jervis.

Passaic formerly had four train stations (Passaic Park, Prospect Street, Passaic and Harrison Street) on the Erie Railroad main line. In 1963, these stations were abandoned and the main line was moved to the Boonton Branch.

Commuter jitney buses operate along Main Avenue providing frequent non-scheduled service to Paterson, Union City, the George Washington Bridge Bus Terminal in Washington Heights, Manhattan, the Port Authority Bus Terminal, and points between.

Films shot in Passaic
 2009: The NBC series Mercy was set at and filmed in the old St Mary's Hospital.
 2006: Be Kind Rewind directed by Michel Gondry.

Notable people

References

External links

 City of Passaic, New Jersey
 The Battle of Passaic by Mary Heaton Vorse, New Masses, May 1926, Transcribed: for marxists.org in January 2002
 Passaic, New Jersey – The Carpathian Connection

 
1873 establishments in New Jersey
Cities in Passaic County, New Jersey
Faulkner Act (mayor–council)
Hispanic and Latino American culture in New Jersey
New Jersey Urban Enterprise Zones
Populated places established in 1873